Stefan Sauer (born 14 January 1966) is a German politician. Born in Rüsselsheim, Hesse, he is a member of the CDU. Stefan Sauer served as a member of the Bundestag from the state of Hesse from 2017 to 2019.

Life 
He became member of the bundestag after the 2017 German federal election. He is a member of the Digital Agenda Committee and the Committee on Economic Cooperation and Development.

He lost his seat in the 2021 German election.

References

External links 

 Bundestag biography 

1966 births
Living people
Members of the Bundestag for Hesse
Members of the Bundestag 2017–2021
Members of the Bundestag for the Christian Democratic Union of Germany